SS Potrero del Llano was an oil tanker built in 1912. She sailed for a number of companies, and survived service in the First World War, only to be torpedoed and sunk by a German U-boat during the Second World War while sailing under the Mexican flag off the coast of Florida. Her sinking contributed to Mexico's decision to enter the war on the side of the Allies.

Potrero del Llano was originally built by Palmers Shipbuilding and Iron Company, Hebburn-on-Tyne as the F.A. Tamplin, for service with T.W. Tamplin & Co., of London. She was sold in 1921 to the Belgian company SA d'Armement, d'Industrie & de Commerce, of Antwerp, and was renamed Arminco, and was sold again in 1930 to the Italian company Società Italiana Transporti Petroliferi (SITP), of Genoa, and was renamed Lucifero. She was interned while docked at Tampico, in Mexico on 10 June 1940 and was seized on 8 December 1941 by the Mexican government and renamed Potrero del Llano
after a town in Veracruz. She was operated by Petróleos Mexicanos (Pemex), and was homeported in Tampico.

Potrero del Llano was sailing unescorted from Tampico to New York City in May 1942, carrying 6,132 tons of petroleum. Suhren noticed an illuminated flag painted on the side of the ship but misidentified it as the Italian flag. Since only ships of the Mexican Navy were permitted to display the Mexican flag with the eagle in the centre, the flag shown by the Potrero del Llano resembled the Italian one, and having decided that the tanker's position and course meant that she could not be Italian, Suhren decided to sink her. U-564 duly torpedoed the Potrero del Llano, which sank with the loss of 13 of her crew.

This established a sound casus belli for the Mexican government to declare war on the Axis powers on 22 May 1942.

Notes

References
 

1912 ships
1942 in Mexico
Maritime incidents in May 1942
Military history of Mexico during World War II
Oil tankers
Ships of Mexico
Ships sunk by German submarines in World War II
Tankers of Belgium
Tankers of the United Kingdom
Ships built on the River Tyne
World War I merchant ships of the United Kingdom
World War II merchant ships of Italy
World War II shipwrecks in the Atlantic Ocean